Trunk Island is the largest island in Harrington Sound, Bermuda. The island has been owned by the Tucker/Gardner family since the early 19th century and was used as a summer camp for Bermudian groups such as Sea Scouts and Girl Guides in the 1920s and 1930s. It remains privately owned by descendants of the first owners, although a share of the ownership of the mansion plot has now been donated to the Bermuda Zoological Society, which supports educational programs at the Bermuda Aquarium, Museum and Zoo. The Bermuda Zoological Society purchased the cottage property and has created a living classroom throughout the island.

Islands of Bermuda
Hamilton Parish
Private islands of Bermuda